James Dawkins, from 1835 James Colyear Dawkins (1760 – 13 March 1843) was a British plantation and slave owner, and Member of Parliament for Chippenham from 1784 to 1812.

He was the eldest son of Henry Dawkins II, a wealthy owner of plantations in Jamaica, and his wife Lady Juliana Colyear, daughter of Charles Colyear, 2nd Earl of Portmore. He was educated at Christ Church, Oxford from where he matriculated on 4 May 1779, aged 18. Dawkins succeeded his father as Member for Chippenham. Following an election campaign in 1807–1808, which proved very expensive, Dawkins sold his property at Chippenham and was returned in 1812 for Hastings, retaining the seat until 1826. He then sat for Wilton from 1831 to 1832.

He married in September 1785 Hannah Phipps, daughter of Thomas Phipps of Heywood, Wiltshire, widow of Charles Long of Grittleton, Wiltshire. They had three children: James (died infant), George-Augustus (1791–1821, without issue) and Caroline-Anne (died unmarried 1857). Secondly, he married in 1814 Maria Forbes, daughter of General Gordon Forbes. He took the name Colyear by royal licence in 1835 after succeeding to the estates of his cousin Thomas Colyear, 4th Earl of Portmore. 

Heir to sugar plantations in Jamaica, he voted against the abolition of the slave trade in 1796. He owned Friendship and Sandy Gully plantations after 1812. The inheritance included seven sugar estates, three livestock pens, and various smaller properties throughout the island. The plantations included Parnassus, Old Plantation and Sutton's in Clarendon, and Dawkins Caymanas in St Catherine parish.

By 1820, he had been 35 years in Parliament "without a murmur credited to him in debate". He died a commoner on 13 March 1843, aged 83.

See also 
 List of MPs in the first United Kingdom Parliament

References

1760 births
1843 deaths
British MPs 1784–1790
British MPs 1790–1796
British MPs 1796–1800
UK MPs 1801–1802
UK MPs 1802–1806
UK MPs 1806–1807
UK MPs 1807–1812
Members of the Parliament of Great Britain for English constituencies
Members of the Parliament of the United Kingdom for English constituencies